The  was a political party in Japan that existed between 1951 and 1955.

History 
Following the defeat of the Japanese Socialist Party in 1948 at the hands of Japan's two main conservative parties, the Liberal Party and the Democrat Party, the SDPJ dissolved into chaos and internal bickering between moderate reformist socialist and more radical revolutionary socialists. As a result of the SDPJ split, some of its members formed a more centrist social-democratic party, while others formed a more radical socialist party. Both groups claimed the name Nihon Shakaitō but different English translations, and are known as the Left Socialist Party of Japan and the Right Socialist Party of Japan, respectively. On domestic policy, the Right Socialist Party was a centre-left social-democratic party.

The left wing was in chaos between 1948 and 1955. In early 1955, the Left Socialists and the Right Socialists reconciled and merged to reform the JSP, months before the Liberal Democrat Party was created through the merger of the Liberal and Democrat parties. Even though the Right Socialist Party dissolved in 1955 when the JSP reunified, some members of the former Right Socialist Party broke off from the JSP in 1960 and created the Democratic Socialist Party. The Young Socialists, a newly formed youth organisation which retains full membership in the International Union of Socialist Youth, is said to be inherited from the political tradition of the Right Socialist Party.

Election results

House of Representatives

House of Councillors

See also 
 Democratic Socialist Party (Japan)
 Socialist Democratic Federation (Japan)
 List of political parties in Japan
 Politics of Japan
 Social Democratic Party (Japan)

References

Citations

Sources 

 
 
 

Defunct political parties in Japan
Defunct social democratic parties
Anti-communism in Japan
Anti-communist parties
Centre-left parties in Asia
Democratic socialist parties in Asia
Political parties established in 1951
Political parties disestablished in 1955
Social democratic parties in Japan